{{Infobox video game
| title         = Felix the Cat
| image         = FelixNESBoxart.JPG
| caption       = North American NES box art
| developer     = Shimada Kikaku
| publisher     = NESGame Boy  
| released      = NESGame Boy| genre         = Platform
| modes         = Single-player
| platforms     = NESGame Boy
}}Felix the Cat' is a video game released in 1992 for the Nintendo Entertainment System and in 1993 for the Game Boy by Hudson Soft. It is based on the cartoon character Felix the Cat.

Gameplay

The player controls Felix the Cat as he sets out to defeat the evil mad Professor who has kidnapped Felix's lovely girlfriend, Kitty. The Game Boy version plays the same as the NES version but features fewer levels.

Felix the Cat has simple game mechanics.  The A button is used to jump (press repeatedly to fly or swim), and the B button is used to attack.  The type of attack varies depending on the magic level.  When Felix falls into the bottomless pit (past the bottom of the level), runs out of time, or loses all his health, he loses a life. Scattered items replenish health and magic. Enemies include moles, tree trunks, cannons, birds, fish, and eight boss monsters. Enemies generally follow a regular pace back and forth, and Felix can shoot them. If Felix takes a hit, his magic power goes down one level. If Felix is at the lowest magic power and gets hit, he loses a life. There are nine worlds.

ReceptionGamePro gave the NES version 5 out of 5. Three reviewers in Game Informer gave the NES version 7.5, 6.5, and 8.25 (all out of 10). Allgame editor Skyler Miller described the game as "an example of the right way to produce a game using a popular license". French magazines Player One and Consoles+'' gave the NES version 79%. and 87% respectively.

References

External links

1992 video games
Electro Brain games
Video Game
Game Boy games
Hudson Soft games
Nintendo Entertainment System games
Platform games
Single-player video games
Video games about cats
Video games based on animated television series
Video games developed in Japan